Berezovo is a village in the Khust Raion of Zakarpattia Oblast, Ukraine. , its population was 3,000.

References

Villages in Khust Raion